Ora Kedem (Hebrew: אורה קדם, born 1924) is professor emerita at the Weizmann Institute of Science and a recipient of the Israel Prize for life sciences.

In 2005, Kedem was elected a member of the National Academy of Engineering for contributions to the thermodynamics of irreversible transport processes and the development of separation processes for the treatment of water and wastewater.

See also
 List of Israel Prize recipients

References

External links
 Bio from University of Twente, Netherlands
 Bio in JewishVirtualLibrary.org

Israeli Jews
Academic staff of Ben-Gurion University of the Negev
Academic staff of Weizmann Institute of Science
Israel Prize women recipients
Israel Prize in life sciences recipients
1924 births
Living people
Israeli women scientists
Women biologists
Israeli biologists
20th-century women scientists